Paucisalibacillus algeriensis is a bacterium from the genus of Paucisalibacillus which has been isolated from hypersaline soil from the Ezzemoul Sabkha lake from Oum El Bouaghi in Algeria.

References

 

Bacillaceae
Bacteria described in 2014